Teitel is a surname from the Yiddish word  for "date" (the palm's fruit); compare German . 

It may refer to:

 Amy Shira Teitel (born 1986), Canadian-American popular science writer
 Robert Teitel, American film producer
 Yaakov "Jack" Teitel (born 1972, Florida), American-Israeli murderer

See also 
 Teitelbaum 
 Teitelboim

 
Yiddish words and phrases
Germanic-language surnames
Jewish surnames
Yiddish-language surnames